Steven Lawrie (born 22 February 1984) is a former Scottish rugby union player who played for Edinburgh Rugby in the Pro12.

Background

Steve has played for Scotland at A, under-21 and under-19 levels as well as appearing in the Scotland Sevens squad, making his debut in the 2008 London Sevens tournament and Twickenham and going on to play a week later in the 2008 Edinburgh Sevens at Murrayfield. His Scotland A debut came in the 25–0 win over the United States at Netherdale in November 2010, and he came off the bench in the victory over Italy A in January 2011. Steve captained the Edinburgh under-18, under-19, and under-20 teams who won their respective district championships in successive years (2002 to 2004), and he played for the Scotland under-19 team in the 2002–03 season.

References

External links
Edinburghrugby.org

1984 births
Living people
Doncaster R.F.C. players
Scottish rugby union players
Edinburgh Rugby players
Scotland international rugby union players
People educated at Stewart's Melville College
Scotland international rugby sevens players
Male rugby sevens players